The Political Committee of National Liberation (Politiki Epitropi Ethnikis Apeleftherosis, PEEA), commonly known as the "Mountain Government" (Kivernisi tou Vounou), was a Communist Party-dominated government established in Greece in 1944 in opposition to both the collaborationist German-controlled government at Athens and to the royal government-in-exile in Cairo. It was integrated with the Greek government-in-exile in a national unity government at the Lebanon conference in May 1944.

Background

Establishment 
The PEEA was established on 10 March 1944 by the leftist National Liberation Front (EAM)/Greek People's Liberation Army (ELAS) movement, which was then in control of much of the country. Its aims, according to its founding charter, were, "to intensify the struggle against the conquerors ... for full national liberation, for the consolidation of the independence and integrity of our country (...) and for the annihilation of domestic fascism and armed traitor formations".

The PEEA's authority was significantly reinforced after the establishment of the National Council in 1944. The National Council was an assembly elected by secret elections organised by the PEEA in late April 1944 in both the liberated parts of Greece and the still-occupied cities, mainly Athens. Between 1.5 and 1.8 million Greeks voted in these elections, which are notable for the fact that for the first time in Greece, women were allowed to vote. The Council first converged in Koryschades, a mountain village of Evrytania, from 14 to 27 May 1944. Its main act was voting a resolution, an extract of which is quoted:

The PEEA's first president was Evripidis Bakirtzis, the former leader of National and Social Liberation (EKKA). On April 18 Alexandros Svolos, a prominent professor of constitutional law of the University of Athens, took his position and Bakirtzis became vice-president. Not only communist leaders but also many progressive bourgeois, who had nothing to do with communist ideas, participated in the PEEA.

ELAS not only resisted German and Italian occupation forces but also re-organised life in Free Greece, the mountainous areas (i.e. the biggest part of Greece) it controlled. EAM, with the co-ordination and organization of the PEEA, helped the local people organise schools, hospitalise refugees from the big cities and protect the crops from German looting. Amateur actors and musicians created travelling theatres and bands, something that most rural communities had never seen or heard before. Another achievement of ELAS (due partially to the progressive ideas and partially to the lack of men) was to promote women's rights. Young girls, who until then were working at home or the fields, had the opportunity to educate and express themselves. There were also improvised telecommunications either by telephone lines or by messengers and systems of re-distribution of food-resources, so that no village would starve.

Mountain Government

Interim Government

Sources
 
 
 

Greece in World War II
National Liberation Front (Greece)
Political history of Greece
Provisional governments
1944 establishments in Greece
1944 disestablishments in Greece
Organizations established in 1944
Organizations disestablished in 1944
1940s in Greek politics
States and territories established in 1944
States and territories disestablished in 1944
Former socialist republics